Matías Freyre (born 19 August 1994) is an American born Argentinian professional rugby union player. He plays as a utility back for the San Diego Legion in Major League Rugby (MLR). He previously played for the Houston SaberCats.

He previously played for Argentina in the World Rugby Sevens Series.

References

1994 births
Living people
Argentine rugby sevens players
Club Newman rugby union players
Houston SaberCats players
Rugby union fullbacks
Rugby union centres
Argentine rugby union players
Rugby union wings
San Diego Legion players